Tempest is Balflare's second album, released in 2006.

Track listing 
Awakening - (04:49)
End This Misery - (03:56)
Hollow the Dusk - (01:12)
Out Break - (06:06)
Toward Fall - (04:25)
Burning Wild - (03:55)
A False Charge - (04:33)
Storm Lord - (04:05)
Reaching for the Sky - (04:27)
Black Raven - (04:59)
End of Time - (04:25)

Personnel
Eijin Kawazoe - vocals
Leo Yabumoto - guitar
Syuta Hashimoto - guitar and keyboards
Ayuko Hayano - keyboards
Takashi Odaira - bass
Isao Matsuzaki - drums

References

2006 albums
Balflare albums